Stimper Arch is a well-known rock formation in the wall of Kane Gulch on the Cedar Mesa plateau in southeast Utah, in the United States.  The arch has a span of 20 feet and an opening height of 6 ft, and is located about 3.75 miles from the Kane Gulch Ranger Station  Stimper Arch is a popular subject for amateur photographers as well as a destination for many hikers.

References

Natural arches of Utah
Natural arches of San Juan County, Utah